Classic Sportswear, also simply known as Classic, is an Australian sports clothing manufacturer. The company was founded in Sydney in 1934, making them one of the oldest family owned sports clothing companies in Australia. Classic Sportswear manufactures clothing for Australian rules football, basketball, cricket, rugby league, rugby union and soccer.

Classic Sportswear notably sponsors the Canterbury Bankstown Bulldogs, Dolphins, Newcastle Knights, South Sydney and St George Illawarra in the National Rugby League (NRL), and the Brisbane Lions in the Australian Football League (AFL).

See also

 List of fitness wear brands

References

External links
 

Australian companies established in 1934
Clothing companies established in 1934
Sporting goods manufacturers of Australia
Manufacturing companies based in Sydney
Clothing brands of Australia
Sportswear brands
1934 establishments in Australia